Todd County Courthouse may refer to:

Todd County Courthouse (Kentucky), listed on the National Register of Historic Places (NRHP)
Todd County Courthouse (Minnesota), also NRHP-listed